This is a list of Harlequin Romance novels released in 1953.

Releases

References 

Lists of Harlequin Romance novels
1953 novels